John Hersey High School (also referred to as Hersey or JHHS) is a four-year public high school located in Arlington Heights, Illinois, a northwest suburb of Chicago in the United States. It enrolls students from Arlington Heights as well as parts of Prospect Heights and Mount Prospect. The attendance zone also includes small portions of Des Plaines and Glenview which lack residents. Named after American writer John Hersey, it is part of Township High School District 214 which also includes Buffalo Grove High School, Elk Grove High School, Prospect High School, Rolling Meadows High School, and Wheeling High School.

Feeder schools
Public middle schools whose graduates usually attend Hersey include Thomas Middle School, MacArthur Middle School and River Trails Middle School. JHHS also receives students from several private schools such as Quest Academy, St. James School, St. Alphonsus Liguori Catholic School, St. Emily Catholic School, St. Paul Lutheran School, St. Peter Lutheran School, Our Lady of the Wayside School, Christian Liberty Academy and St. John Brebeuf Catholic School.

History
John Hersey High School was opened in the fall of 1968 in Arlington Heights, Illinois, in order to support the growing population of High School District 214. These towns include Arlington Heights, Buffalo Grove, Mt. Prospect, Prospect Heights and Wheeling. John Hersey High School's colors are orange, brown, and white, and the mascot is the husky. John Hersey High School is known as one of the few schools in the state that specifically caters to students with special needs. The hard-of-hearing population at JHHS is one of the largest in the area and well noted. Hersey also welcomed the CLS (Career and Life Skills) program, formerly housed at Wheeling High School, to its school in 2006. JHHS built a new fine arts and fitness section in June 2009.

The Hersey Band's excellence was recognized through placement on the John Philip Sousa Foundation's Roll of Honor of Historic High School Concert Bands. Hersey Bands were founded by band director Don Caneva. During Caneva's ten-year reign at Hersey, his bands brought home over 100 first-place awards.

A few scenes from the 2010 remake A Nightmare on Elm Street were filmed at Hersey in the first week of May 2009.

Academics
According to U.S. News & World Report, JHHS is ranked as the 1st high school in District 214, the 13th high school in Illinois, and as the 286th high school in the United States in 2019.

Hersey offers 23 AP courses, and 69% of its students will have taken at least one AP Exam by the time of graduation. JHHS also offers 82 Career and Technical Education Courses approved by Illinois' CTE Program, including courses in accounting, business, computer programming, construction, engineering, marketing, nutrition, nursing, parenting, and record keeping. Hersey's Fine Arts Department offers courses in art history, band, ceramics, choir, dance, guitar, music theory, orchestra, painting, photography, and theater. French and Spanish are the foreign languages offered to students.

Hersey's student-to-teacher ratio is 17:1, and the average class size is 19 students. The school's graduation rate in 2019 was at 94%.

The class of 2019's average SAT score was 1156.8, placing it higher than District 214's average score of 1076 and Illinois' average score of 994.5. In terms of subject proficiency, 72% of JHHS students are proficient in math, and 78% are proficient in reading. These are the highest proficiency scores in District 214. Hersey has made Adequate Yearly Progress on the Prairie State Achievement Examination, a state test that comprises a part of the No Child Left Behind Act.

Activities
John Hersey High School won 1st place in the 2007 National Deaf Academic Bowl competition. They won again in 2019.

In 2007, the Hersey Huskie Rugby Club went to the Tier II State Championship, but lost to the Morton Mustangs.

The Hersey Marching Huskies won the University of Illinois' field competition in 2006 and won the best overall award, the Governor's Trophy in 2009.

In 2016, the Hersey Marching Huskies swept class 4A at the Illinois State Marching Championships and ended up placing 7th overall.

The Hersey Symphonic Band was also named the 2017 Honor Band at the 2017 Illinois SuperState competition held annually at the University of Illinois.

Athletics
Hersey High School competes in the Mid-Suburban League (MSL) East Division. JHHS is also a member of the Illinois High School Association (IHSA), which governs most interscholastic athletic and competitive activities in Illinois.  Teams from Hersey are stylized as the Huskies. Hersey also keeps records and trophies won by Arlington High School and Forest View High School.

The school sponsors interscholastic teams from both young men and women in basketball, cross country, golf, gymnastics, soccer, swimming & diving, tennis, track & field, volleyball, and water polo. Young men may also compete in baseball, football, and wrestling, while young women may compete in badminton, bowling, cheerleading, dance, and softball.  While not sponsored by the IHSA, the school's athletic department also supervises athletes involved in the Special Olympics.

The following teams have won their respective IHSA sponsored state tournament or meet:

 Archery (girls):  1978–79, no longer sponsored by the IHSA
 Football: 1987–88
 Summer Baseball: 1984
 Gymnastics (boys):  1973–74, 1983–84
 Gymnastics (girls):  1983–84
 Wrestling:  1970–71, 1971–72

John Hersey High School also co-hosts the Illinois High School Association State Tennis Tournaments for boys and girls.

Notable alumni
 Steve Chen, co-founder of YouTube
 Dave Corzine, former NBA player (1978–91) with the Chicago Bulls.
 Bill Glass, American actor who plays 'parentologist' Dr. Rick in television commercials
 Brian Gregory, head men's basketball coach for South Florida.
 Amy Jacobson, news reporter for WIND-AM Chicago.
 Jeff Joniak, radio broadcaster, Chicago Bears and WBBM (AM)
 Brad Marek, golfer, made cut at 2021 PGA Championship
 Marlee Matlin, Academy Award winning television and film actress (Children of a Lesser God).
 Jim Michaels, Golden Globe Nominee & NAACP Image Award winning television producer  (Supernatural, Everybody Hates Chris, Lois & Clark: The New Adventures of Superman, Reasonable Doubts, Midnight Caller)
 Jacky Rosen, current United States Senator from Nevada.
 Mary E. Sobczak, White House Aide, Former U.S. Department of Treasury Official and Spokesman 
 Ben Weasel (Benjamin Foster), founding member and lead singer of punk band Screeching Weasel.
 Frank Kmet, Kmet was drafted by the Buffalo Bills in the fourth round of the 1992 NFL Draft

Notable staff

Don Caneva, band director, conductor, music editor, and festival founder. Founder of the Hersey Bands program. The excellence of the Band was recognized on the John Philip Sousa Foundation's Roll of Honor of Historic High School Concert Bands.

References

External links

 Official website
 District 214 School Profile
 Newsweek Rankings
 District 214 Homepage

Public high schools in Cook County, Illinois
Schools in Arlington Heights, Illinois
1968 establishments in Illinois
Educational institutions established in 1968